Key4Life is a British charity launched on 14 June 2013 to help reduce youth reoffending through the delivery of a rehabilitation programme to those in prison and those at risk of going to prison. Jonathan Joseph and Anthony Watson, the England and Bath Rugby players, have pledged their support to Key4Life, the young offender rehabilitation charity.
The charity tries to assist young men in prison who may be having difficulty in not returning to a life of crime and becoming some growing statics of reoffending youth in the UK. Since the charity started, the 23 young adults that Key4Life have worked with, 8% have reoffended which is much better than the national average of 74%.

History

On 4 December 2013 a launch party for the charity raised £80,000 and included performance from some of the former young offenders who had already benefited from the scheme. The evening was hosted by Universal Music and Jessie Ware. Also screened was a short film by supported to the charity John Walsh

"Key4Life & the Value of Music" is the first Key4Life blog post to be featured on The BRIT Trust website.

Results and Research

116 young men have been through the Key4Life programme at HM Prison Ashfield, HM Prison Isis, HM Prison Portland, HM Prison Wormwood Scrubs and Somerset Preventative 'At Risk' programmes.

2017 programmes include a 'At Risk' programme in London, a further programme at HMP/YOI Portland and the first-ever residential programme at HMP Guys Marsh

145 mentors trained and provided support to young men pre- and post-release

80 businesses involved in providing Work Tasters, workshops and employment.

References

External links
Key4Life web site

Prison charities based in the United Kingdom
Organizations established in 2013
Charities based in London
2013 establishments in the United Kingdom